Morden College is a long-standing charity which has been providing residential care in Blackheath, south-east London, England for over 300 years.

It was founded by philanthropist Sir John Morden in 1695 as a home for 'poor Merchants... and such as have lost their Estates by accidents, dangers and perils of the seas or by any other accidents ways or means in their honest endeavours to get their living by means of Merchandizing.'

Morden College was built (to a design sometimes attributed to Sir Christopher Wren, but largely carried out by Edward Strong, his master mason) on the north-east corner of the Wricklemarsh estate. It was described by Daniel Lysons in Environs of London (1796):

The original college buildings were intended to house 40 single or widowed men. Today, Morden College is a Grade I listed building (designated 19 October 1951).

Trustees

Turkey Company Period (1708–1826)
College trustees were drawn from the Turkey Company.
Lysons reported:

Subsequent donations to the college by prominent Turkey merchants and their wives helped assure that the college would survive. Lysons recorded those donors and the totals of their gifts:

East India Company Period (1827–1884)
The first British East India Company Trustee was William Astell. He held the position from 1827 to 1847. John Lubbock was Chairman of the Trustees from 1873 to 1889.

Court of Aldermen of the City of London Period (1884 – )
During the 20th century, admission requirements were amended so that the college could accommodate women and married couples, and several new buildings were added. The college also manages other homes in Blackheath and in Beckenham. Today, it functions as a retirement home.

Other key people

Chaplains
Moses Browne

Notable residents
 Henry Newton Knights (1872–1959), former Conservative Member of Parliament, died here
 Ann Moss, FBA (1938–2018), scholar of French literature and classical reception, died here

References

External links
 

 
1695 establishments in England
Blackheath, London
Christopher Wren buildings in London
Grade I listed buildings in the Royal Borough of Greenwich
Organizations established in 1695